Hart is an unincorporated community in Hart Township, Winona County, Minnesota, United States. The Metz Family Farm and the Metz Hart-Land Creamery and  cheese plant are located near Hart.

Notes

Unincorporated communities in Winona County, Minnesota
Unincorporated communities in Minnesota